Nordstromia argenticeps is a moth in the family Drepanidae. It was described by Warren in 1922. It is found in the Khasi Hills of north-eastern India and in Nepal.

Adults are similar to Nordstromia sumatrana, except for the shape of the postmedial fascia which is weakly sigmoid.

The larvae feed on Rubus species.

References

Moths described in 1922
Drepaninae